Lillyann Mason-Spice is an Australian rugby union player. She plays for the Brumbies in the Super W competition.

Biography 
In 2019, Mason-Spice was selected to represent Australian A at the Oceania Rugby Championship in Fiji.

In 2022, Mason-Spice represented the Australian Barbarians team against Japan who were on tour in Australia. She was later named in the Australian squad for the 2022 Pacific Four Series in New Zealand.

References 

Year of birth missing (living people)
Living people
Australia women's international rugby union players
Australian female rugby union players